Florence Guédy (born 7 December 1954) is a French former professional tennis player.

Guédy was a girls' singles finalist at the 1971 French Open. She played in six Federation Cup ties for France in the 1970s, which included a World Group quarter-final against the United States in 1974. Her best performance in a grand slam tournament was a quarter-finalist appearance in women' doubles at the 1974 French Open (with Rosie Darmon).

See also
List of France Federation Cup team representatives

References

External links
 
 
 

1954 births
Living people
French female tennis players